Sukhrali is a census town in Gurgaon district in the Indian state of Haryana.

Demographics
 India census, Sukhrali had a population of 10,384. Males constitute 54% of the population and females 46%. Sukhrali has an average literacy rate of 78%, higher than the national average of 59.5%: male literacy is 82%, and female literacy is 64%. In Sukhrali, 12% of the population is under 6 years of age.

References

Cities and towns in Gurgaon district